This list of Honorary Doctors of the University of Canterbury shows recipients of an honorary doctorate bestowed by the University of Canterbury since 1962, for those bestowed prior to the dissolution of University of New Zealand see List of Honorary Doctors of the University of New Zealand.

Footnotes

References

Canterbury
Lists of New Zealand people
New Zealand education-related lists